A constitutional referendum was held in the Helvetic Republic on 25 May 1802. Unlike the constitution approved in 1798, the new constitution, known as the Malmaison constitution, did not provide for any referendums. Non-voters were assumed to have voted in favour of the new constitution, a measure put in place to prevent its rejection. As a result, 72.17% of voters were deemed to be in favour.

Results

References

1802 referendums
1802 in Switzerland
1802
Constitutional referendums